Cellana sandwicensis, common name the yellow-foot ʻopihi, is a species of edible true limpet, a marine gastropod mollusc in the family Nacellidae, one of the families of true limpets.

Distribution
This species is endemic to the islands of Hawaii.

Cellana sandwicensis has been found in Taiwanese coastal waters, possibly spread by larvae transported in ship ballast water.

Habitat
This limpet lives lower in the intertidal zone than Cellana exarata, the black-foot ʻopihi. They are found, strongly attached, sometimes with considerable force, with their foot to rocks or other hard substrates. They feed by grazing on algae.

Description
The large, muscular foot of the animal is yellow in the center but gray on its margin. The white head is short with one pair of tentacles with dark pigments on the backside. The flattened shell is dark green on the outside and silvery white on the inside. Its shape is almost oval and its apex is situated somewhat lower than the central. The ribs radiate from the central and extend beyond the margin.

Human use
This species is used as a food item. It is considered a higher quality food than the black-foot ʻopihi.

Legislation
In 2009, the Hawaii Legislature approved a bill that would have banned the harvest of ʻopihi (limpets) on the island of Oahu for five years. The bill was successfully vetoed by governor Linda Lingle.

Gallery

References

 Severns, M. (2011). Shells of the Hawaiian Islands - The Sea Shells. Conchbooks, Hackenheim. 564 pp. page(s): 36

Nacellidae
Endemic fauna of Hawaii
Molluscs of Hawaii
Molluscs of the Pacific Ocean
Gastropods described in 1861
Edible molluscs